Vitebsk (also Vitebsk Northeast or Andronovichi) is an former air base in Belarus located 8 km northeast of Vitebsk. It was a small airfield complex with a single large tarmac. In Soviet times it was home to the 339th Military Air Transport Regiment (339 VTAP) flying 32 Ilyushin Il-76 cargo jets as well as Antonov An-22 planes.

References

Soviet Air Force bases
Soviet Military Transport Aviation
Military installations of Belarus
Airports in Belarus
Buildings and structures in Vitebsk
Vitebsk
Belarusian Air Force